Looking up at the Starry Sky is a  widely known poem written by the Chinese Premier Wen Jiabao  "to encourage young people to aim high and pursue their goals fearlessly." The poem is directed at the Post-80s, who are China's Generation Y, and who may have Little Emperor Syndrome due to the one-child policy.

See also
May Fourth Movement
Strawberry generation

References
Notes

External links
Looking up at the Starry Sky ----Wen Jiabao original and translation
I Look Up at the Starry Sky: A Translation

Chinese poems
Society of China